The Kittanning Citizens Bridge is a through truss bridge spanning the Allegheny River at Kittanning in the U.S. state of Pennsylvania.  Constructed in 1932, the bridge carries vehicles and pedestrians between Kittanning and West Kittanning.

The bridge has appeared in several feature films.  It was used as a backdrop and later in the climax scene of the 2002 horror film, The Mothman Prophecies.  It was intended to represent the famous Silver Bridge in Point Pleasant, West Virginia, which collapsed in 1967. This is despite the fact that Silver Bridge was a suspension bridge and not a through truss bridge. Effects were used to add piers and suspension cables to Kittanning Citizens Bridge, although it is clearly still a through truss bridge in the film.

It was also filmed for the opening credits of the 2012 movie One for the Money, and is shown briefly in the 2009 film The Hole. Also seen in the 2009 film My Bloody Valentine.

See also
 
 
 
 List of crossings of the Allegheny River

References

External links
West Kittanning Bridge replacement project

Bridges over the Allegheny River
Truss bridges in the United States
Bridges completed in 1932
Kittanning, Pennsylvania
Bridges in Armstrong County, Pennsylvania
Road bridges in Pennsylvania
Bridges of the United States Numbered Highway System
U.S. Route 22
1932 establishments in Pennsylvania